Axel Cédric Konan (born 25 January 1983 in Abidjan) is an Ivorian footballer, who is currently contracted with Swiss Super League club AC Bellinzona.

Career
Despite being born in Ivory Coast, he grew up into the youth system of Southern Italian club Lecce, making his senior debut in 2000. He played for Lecce from 2000 to 2009, except for a season loan to Torino in 2006–07.

When Konan's contract expired in June 2009, Lecce decided not to offer the Ivorian striker a new bid; he was subsequently unattached for an entire season (also failing a trial at Atalanta), before agreeing a one-year deal with Swiss club AC Bellinzona on November 2010.

References

External links
 Gazzetta dello Sport profile

1983 births
Living people
Ivorian footballers
Ivorian expatriate footballers
U.S. Lecce players
Torino F.C. players
AC Bellinzona players
Association football forwards
Serie A players
Serie B players
Serie C players
Swiss Super League players
Expatriate footballers in Italy
Expatriate footballers in Switzerland
Footballers from Abidjan